Don: The Chase Begins Again, better known simply as Don, is a 2006 Indian Hindi-language action thriller film directed by Farhan Akhtar. The film was produced by Ritesh Sidhwani and Akhtar's production company Excel Entertainment. The film stars  Shah Rukh Khan as the titular anti-hero and Priyanka Chopra as Roma. While Arjun Rampal, Isha Koppikar, Boman Irani, Pavan Malhotra, Rajesh Khattar and Om Puri appears in supporting roles. Kareena Kapoor makes a special appearance. Don is the reboot version of the 1978 film of the same title, and follows the titular criminal's look-alike who has been sent on a clandestine mission to impersonate Don after he is wounded in a chase, and to gather intelligence on the drug mafia.

In remaking the film from a new perspective, Akhtar wanted to give a contemporary style and treatment to the original film and make a film that he believed would be perfectly suited to modern times. The director later bought the rights and conceived his adaptation as an homage to the original film and its cast and crew, and to the 1970s era in general. He co-wrote the screenplay with his father, Javed Akhtar, who had also written the original script with Salim Khan. He kept the basic plot but introduced some changes that included an international setting and a different ending. Principal photography commenced in Mumbai, before moving to Malaysia, where 80% of the filming was done. The soundtrack was composed by Shankar–Ehsaan–Loy, with lyrics by Javed Akhtar.

Don: The Chase Begins Again released on 20 October 2006, coinciding with the festive season of Diwali, clashing with Jaan-E-Mann starring Salman Khan, Akshay Kumar and Preity Zinta. It proved to be a major commercial success, grossing over 1.06 billion at the box-office against a production and marketing budget of 400 million, thus becoming the fifth highest grossing Hindi film of 2006. It received positive reviews from critics, with praise for its action sequences, soundtrack, production design, cinematography, and Khan and Chopra's performances. Khan returned to playing the villain, after a decade, having played the villain in four films prior to this, starting with Baazigar, and last being Ram Jaane.

Don won Best Asian Film at the Neuchâtel International Fantastic Film Festival. The film also received 9 nominations at the 52nd Filmfare Awards, including Best Film and Best Actor (Khan). 

A sequel titled Don 2 was released on 23 December 2011.

Plot
The illegal drug trade based in Kuala Lumpur, Malaysia is booming. A team headed by Deputy Commissioner of Police D' Silva targets the operations of cartel leader Singhania to capture his manager, Mark Donald (aka Don). Singhania is one of the two lieutenants of a deceased kingpin, known as Boris; the other is Vardhaan.

Don kills Ramesh, one of his close associates, after he tries to leave the gang. Ramesh's fiancée Kamini decides to help the police. She uses herself as bait in an attempt to trap him, but Don, knowing of her plan, kills her.

Roma, Ramesh's sister, plans to avenge her brother and sister-in-law's deaths, and infiltrates Don's gang. Don is injured and falls into a coma while trying to flee from the police. D' Silva finds a look-alike named Vijay and asks him to join his mission. Vijay agrees when De Silva promises to admit Deepu, a boy Vijay takes care of, to school. Meanwhile, Jasjit, an information technologist and Deepu's father, is released from prison. He plans to kill De Silva to avenge his own wife's death. Several years ago, Jasjit was captured by an unknown assailant who made a deal with him in order to save his kidnapped wife. However, De Silva caught him and refused to believe Jasjit, shooting him in the leg and giving him a permanent limp. Jasjit's wife died shortly after his arrest.

At the hospital, a doctor gives Vijay scars identical to Don's. When Don suddenly dies after the operation, the masquerade begins. Vijay, posing as Don, joins the gang. De Silva asks Vijay to find a computer disc containing details about the drug cartel. When Vijay finds it, Roma attempts to kill him, but De Silva tells her of Don's real identity, and she agrees to help. Vijay hands over the disc to D' Silva. D' Silva murders Singhania, and the police arrest Vijay. De Silva is killed in the shootout, devastating Vijay, as De Silva was the only person who could prove that he is not the real Don. Having discovered his true identity, Don's associates turn against him. Vijay escapes and meets with Roma to recover the disc and prove his innocence.

Jasjit finds the disc in De Silva's apartment. He receives a call and is told that he will have to bring the disc to the men who are holding Deepu hostage. He learns that De Silva has been alive all along and is actually Vardhaan, Boris's other lieutenant, who was using Vijay to reach Singhania. Jasjit reunites with Deepu and teams up with Vijay and Roma. The trio comes up with a plan and informs Interpol.

In combat, Vijay overpowers Vardhan but is interrupted by Inspector Vishal Malik, who has Vardhaan arrested. Vijay is acquitted, and Roma confesses her love for him. Too late, she realises, in a twist ending, that she was being toyed with: Don is alive and was pretending to be Vijay all along. At the hospital, Don had overheard Vardhaan and Vijay's plan. After Vijay's operation, Don switched places with him and injected an overdose of diazepam in Vijay's glucose stream, causing him to die and making the doctors think it was Don who died. The disc Don gave to the police was fake. Now, with both Vardhaan and Singhania removed, Don becomes the master of the Asian drug cartel.

Cast

 Shah Rukh Khan as Mark Donald aka "Don" alias Vijay
 Priyanka Chopra as Roma Bhagat
 Isha Koppikar as Anita Sinha
 Boman Irani as DCP D'Silva / Vardhaan Makhija
 Arjun Rampal as Jasjit "J. J." Ahuja
 Om Puri as Interpol Officer Vishal Malik
 Kareena Kapoor as Kamini Arora (special appearance)
 Pavan Malhotra as Narang Singh
 Rajesh Khattar as Mr. Sanjeev Singhania (Don's boss)
 Tanay Chheda as Deepak "Deepu" Ahuja (J. J.'s son)
 Satyajit Sharma as Mystery Man
 Chunky Pandey as T. J. (special appearance)
 Sushma Reddy as Geeta Ahuja (J. J.'s wife)
 Diwakar Pundir as Ramesh Bhagat (Roma's brother who was killed by Don after leaving the gang without informing Don)

Production

Development
Farhan Akhtar conceived the idea to remake the 1978 film of the same name after listening to a remixed version of a song from the original film. In early 2005, media started reporting that Akhtar was planning to remake the film, but rather than confirming the news, he revealed that though he was writing the screenplay based on the film, he would take the final decision after completing the script. The director co-wrote the film with his father, Javed Akhtar, who had also written the original film with Salim Khan.

Akhtar revealed that the reason behind the remake was a desire to give a new treatment to "a fantastic film which he enjoyed watching as a child", and create an adaptation that he thought would suit modern times. He found the film a little ahead of its time. And, he thought so because of the narration, dialogue, and the writing style, which he thought was very modern even for its time. Akhtar said,"Don is the one film from that time that in my mind lends itself to being remade today. So today, when you adapt it, it fits very easily into a contemporary space. I think it fits into the modern sensibility of movie viewing." Additionally, he wanted to pay tribute to the stars and makers of the original film, the 1970s era in general, and the films made by Salim–Javed and Amitabh Bachchan.

In order to suit the modern sensibility, several changes were introduced. Akhtar changed a number of aspects of the climax as he felt the original ending was outdated for today's audiences. On the other hand, a number of elements from the original were retained in the new film, notably the background score, two songs, some dialogue, and some situations, all of which Akhtar believed were fine in the original, saying that not including them would be a crime.

Casting
Akhtar initially wanted Hrithik Roshan for the titular character, after having worked with him on Lakshya (2004). However, Akhtar felt that the character required a more mature actor, saying he wanted "a face that had seen the world and roughed it out." The director said that Roshan's innocence was not right for the role, and instead cast Shah Rukh Khan for the part that had been portrayed by Amitabh Bachchan in the 1978 film. Akhtar believed that Khan was the most suitable for the role, saying, "He has the personality, the style, the flair, the larger than life persona, the sense of humour and the sheer magnetism that this character requires."

In July 2005, Priyanka Chopra was cast to play Roma, a role originally played by Zeenat Aman. Akhtar found Chopra to be perfect for the role, saying, "There is a docile sensuality about her which suits the character." When he offered the role to her, she was excited to play the character and immediately agreed to do the film. Later that month Arjun Rampal and Isha Koppikar joined the cast. While Rampal was cast as Jasjit, played by Pran in the original, after Akshay Kumar turned down the role for being secondary, Koppikar was cast in a completely new role that was not in the original film. In August 2005 Kareena Kapoor was confirmed to appear in the song "Yeh Mera Dil", which had been performed by Helen in the original film.

Khan, Chopra, and Rampal underwent extensive martial arts training from an expert from the Shaolin Temple. The principal cast received training in different kinds of martial arts. Khan revealed that he had always wanted to look the way Amitabh Bachchan had in his films, but he said he gave his own interpretation to the role. After signing to do the film, Chopra was very excited, but a few days later, she became nervous, wondering if she would be able to do justice to the character. Having seen the original film as a teenager, Chopra avoided watching the film again as she did not wanted to imitate Zeenat Aman's portrayal of Roma. She made a conscious effort to give her own look and style to the character.

This was Chopra's first action role, and she was excited to the part, so she wanted to do all the stunts by herself. After Chopra decided to perform her own stunts, Akhtar revealed that he was happy as it gave him the scope to film the fight sequences from different angles. Rampal, in the role of Jasjit, said that he approached his character in a way similar to how Pran had played it in the original but with an emotional graph. Boman Irani, who plays DCP D'Silva, a role performed by Iftekhar in the original film, revealed that he played the role according to what suited the script, but retained some of the dignity from that film.

Filming

Principal photography commenced in February 2006 in central Mumbai. Art direction was handled by Aradhana Seth, and the costumes were designed by Aki Narula. Akhtar chose K. U. Mohanan to handle the cinematography after having been impressed by his work in documentaries and TV commercials. To give an authentic feel to the film, scenes were shot on a closed set in actual chawls in real locations. The film was also shot at Film City and Yash Raj Studios. Some filming was done in Paris in March over a 3-day schedule.

The filming moved to Kuala Lumpur, Malaysia, in April 2006 where the majority of the film was shot. 80% of the filming was done in Kuala Lumpur and Langkawi. In Malaysia, filming was done over the course of 70 days at 42 locations including KLCC, Kampung Baru, and Penchala Link, and included more than 1000 extras, all of whom were selected following auditions. Additional filming was done in Singapore. Apparently, the former Prime Minister of Malaysia Mahathir Mohamad, who had previously declined even Hollywood films to be filmed in the Petronas Towers, gave his permission for the crew to film inside his personal office in the Towers. For a scene depicting a media ambush, several real-life journalists from India and Malaysia were hired.

The song "Yeh Mera Dil" was choreographed by Farah Khan. Veteran choreographer Saroj Khan agreed to choreograph the new version of the popular song "Khaike Paan Banaras Waala", which had been choreographed by her mentor P L Raj in the original film. The song was filmed in Malaysia on 13 May 2006 with Khan and Chopra. The dancing for other songs was choreographed by Prabhu Deva, Ganesh Hegde, and Rajeev Surti. Hollywood technician Angelo Sahin, the special Effects supervisor behind Mission: Impossible 2 (2000), and aerial stunt co-ordinator Joe Jennings, known for his work in films such as Charlie's Angels (2000), were hired for the action sequences. Filming was also at the Petronas Towers

Music

The soundtrack was composed by Shankar–Ehsaan–Loy, with lyrics written by Javed Akhtar. The album contains 8 songs: 3 original, 2 remakes of from the original film, a theme, a reprise, and a remix of one of the 3 new songs. The vocals were performed by Shaan, Sunidhi Chauhan, Shankar Mahadevan, Alisha Chinai, Mahalakshmi Iyer, Sonu Nigam, Udit Narayan and MIDIval Punditz. It was released on 27 September 2006 by T-Series.

The soundtrack received positive reviews from music critics, who praised "Aaj Ki Raat", calling it "innovative" and the best song on the album. The recreation of songs from the original film, "Ye Mera Dil" and "Khaike Paan Banaraswala", received mixed reviews. Joginder Tuteja from Bollywood Hungama gave the album a 4 out of 5, noting its success at surprising its listener, and wrote, "Shankar-Ehsaan-Loy do exceedingly well with the soundtrack and establish their supremacy as the composer trio who can give their own even while rearranging the songs from the past." Planet Bollywood gave a rating of 6.5 out of 10, praising its lyrics and vocals, and termed "Aaj Ki Raat" as "the best song in the entire soundtrack." Sukanya Verma of Rediff.com was less impressed with the album, calling it "Snazzy, good mix" and writing, "This lavish enterprise has a little bit of everything. An eclectic mix of old, new and everything in between; Don is an unusual presentation of old-wine-in-new-bottle."

The Don soundtrack album was the first Indian soundtrack to be released on iTunes on the same day of its launch or before the public release of physical copies. The music topped charts on a number of platforms in India. It was one of the best-selling Bollywood soundtracks of the year, with 1.5 million units sold according to Box Office India. The song "Aaj Ki Raat" was used by A. R. Rahman in his Grammy and Academy Award-winning soundtrack Slumdog Millionaire (2008).

Marketing

Being a remake of an iconic film, and the star-cast involved, Don was one of the most anticipated films of the year. The first look poster was released in late April 2006, which according to the media hinted at the kind of adaptation the film was going to be. This was followed by another poster in late July 2006, which also revealed the release date of the film. Following the poster reveals, the trailer was released in mid-September. Bollywood Hungama deemed it promising, writing that the "trendy accessories, sleek gadgets, lavish settings, expensive wardrobe and deadly action scenes build the framework of the new Don." To promote the film, the filmmakers teamed up with Hungama Digital Media Entertainment to launch a mobile game based on the film. It was the first multiplayer online game launched for any Bollywood film. The filmmakers also launched popcorn holders of Don before the release film. An 80-page comic book was published and copies were given for free in multiplexes along with the tickets of the film.

Release

Theatrical
In December 2005, UTV Motion Pictures acquired the overseas rights of the film. Made on a production and marketing budget of 400 million, Don was released worldwide on 20October 2006 in 800 screens during the Diwali festive season, clashing with another high-profile Bollywood film Jaan-E-Mann. The film opened to excellent to very good response at the domestic box-office, with an occupancy of 90%.

Home media
The Home media was distributed by T-Series Home Entertainment domestically and Internationally by UTV, the film was released on DVDs on 5December 2006 across all regions in a 2-disc Collector's Edition pack in NTSC format, with several bonus content such as making of the film, bloopers, trailers, deleted scenes, and clap track. It also included a "Don Comic Book." A steel case limited edition DVD was released in January 2007 with the same bonus features. The VCD version was released at the same time. A single-disc DVD pack was also released later. The Blu-ray version was released on 27April 2011.

Television Premiere 
Don's television premiere was occurred on Star Plus in 2007.

Reception

Box office
Don grossed a first day opening of 46million and 141million on its opening weekend. It also received a good opening in overseas markets with an opening weekend of over $2.2million. On its opening weekend, the film grossed over 302million worldwide. After its first week, the film took in more than 244million in India. The film grossed $1.1million in its first week in UK, while the total overseas first week earnings were more than $4.1million. The film grossed 529million worldwide at the end of first week. The film had a very good hold in its second week, and performed extremely well, even better than that week's new release and collections increased in several centers, with setting new second week highs. After its theatrical run, the film grossed over 710million in India, becoming the fifth highest-grossing Indian film of 2006, and was deemed a "hit". It also grossed over $7.8million in the overseas territories and was declared a blockbuster.

Critical response
Upon release, Don was well received by critics. Mayank Shekhar from Mumbai Mirror gave the film a rating of 4 out of 5 and wrote, "The former was a character-driven, intimate film, albeit a fairly slick thriller, mostly for its screenplay. The latter is a most updated Indian film of the action genre that always calculably concentrates on the new twists, and the turning points, both of which mostly seem cleverer than contrived; ably fitting pieces, the known characters, into a new domino." Raja Sen of Rediff.com felt the film was "conventional and predictable", and complained that the director did not develop his characters. However, Sen was impressed by Chopra's performance and wrote, "[She] handles her role with efficiency, looking every bit the competent woman of actionand a ravishing babe who fills out a skintight white jumpsuit deliciously."

Pratim D. Gupta of The Telegraph  gave the film a positive review, noting that the director turned a formula "good defeats bad" film into a modern-day neo-noir film where "bad fights bad", and wrote, "The new Don is more of a remix than the remake with the scratchy edges smoothened out with grunge grooves and blistering beats. Farhan changes the backdrop and the background and yet manages to keep the original sequences and lines." Gupta also praised the acting, "eye-catching locations", cinematography, and production design, and thought that the "breathtaking chase and action sequences" broke new grounds on Indian screens. Bollywood Hungama's Taran Adarsh rated the film a 3 out of 5, praising the performances of the lead actors and writing "Shah Rukh Khan does very well as Don. He enacts the evil character with a flourish. But he fails to carry off the other role [Vijay] with conviction. It looks made up, it doesn't come naturally to him at all. Priyanka Chopra carries off her part with 'lan. The stunt [when she rescues Khan] is bound to win her laurels."
 
Planet Bollywood gave a rating of a 7 out of 10, particularly praising the twist ending, and wrote, "The Don of the 21st century is stylish with flaws, yet, you do enjoy the experience of watching it in the cinema." While labelling the film a "disappointment", film critic Sukanya Verma questioned Akhtar's decision behind remaking an important film. She further criticised Akhtar for taking a fairly simple but engaging storyline, and turning it into a shockingly unimaginative adaptation. Verma also found Khan to be inconsistent in the dual roles. Giving a 1 out of 5, film critic Rajeev Masand panned the film, terming it an exercise in indulgence, and wrote, "Spiffily shot and stylishly packaged, the new Don may wear a new look, but what it's clearly lacking is the raw energy, the unpredictability of Chandra Barot's original thriller."

Accolades

Sequel

A sequel entitled Don 2, also directed by Akhtar, was released on 23December 2011. Khan, Chopra, Irani, and Puri reprise their roles as Don, Roma, DeSilva alias Vardhan, and Malik, respectively.

See also
Cypher

References

External links
 
 
 
 
 
 

2006 films
Reboot films
Films set in Paris
Films set in Mumbai
Remakes of Indian films
Films set in Malaysia
Indian gangster films
Films about lookalikes
Films shot in Malaysia
2000s crime action films
2000s Hindi-language films
2006 crime thriller films
Films with screenplays by Salim–Javed
2006 action thriller films
Indian crime action films
Indian crime thriller films
Indian action thriller films
Films about the illegal drug trade
Films about organised crime in India
Girls with guns films
Films directed by Farhan Akhtar
Films about the Narcotics Control Bureau